Stereostele nevilli is a species of air-breathing land snails, terrestrial pulmonate gastropod mollusks in the family Streptaxidae.

Stereostele nevilli is the only species in the genus Stereostele.

Subspecies 
Subspecies of Stereostele nevilli include:
 Stereostele nevilli nevilli (Adams, 1868)
 Stereostele nevilli parvidentata Gerlach & Bruggen, 1999

Distribution 
Stereostele nevilli is endemic to the Seychelles.

References

Streptaxidae